"Exhausted" is a song by American rock band Foo Fighters. It was also issued as a promotional single, pressed on black 12" vinyl. The song is notable for being the first original Foo Fighters track released to the public, when it premiered January 8, 1995 on Eddie Vedder's Self-Pollution Radio broadcast.

Live performances
The song was a fixture during the band's early tours. It was often used to close the set, allowing the band to draw it out and play with the distortion and feedback. After 1996, the song began to be dropped in favor of other songs and was played three times on The Colour and the Shape tour, twice on the There Is Nothing Left to Lose tour, and once on the One by One tour. It was dropped after the One by One tour and wasn't played until the Wasting Light tour in 2012. It was played once more at a promotional show for Sonic Highways.

Artwork
The cover artwork was created by Tim Gabor, who was also credited for the design and art direction of the debut album. The front image was eventually used again for a promotional CD single of "For All the Cows". All photos displayed on the back cover would later appear slightly rearranged in the liner notes of the debut album.

Track listing

The B-side, "Winnebago", originally appeared on the Late! album Pocketwatch in 1992. The re-recorded version presented here would be excluded from the final album (except on the Australian bonus disc), but made two more b-side appearances on "This Is a Call", and the US maxi single version of "Big Me".

References

1995 debut singles
Foo Fighters songs
Songs written by Dave Grohl
1995 songs